New Jersey United Christian Academy is a private Christian middle and high school serving students in sixth through twelfth grades, located in the Cream Ridge section of Upper Freehold Township, in Monmouth County, New Jersey, United States. New Jersey United Christian Academy (NJUCA) is ranked by Niche as the #3 Best Private High School in Monmouth County, New Jersey.

As of the 2021–22 school year, the school had an enrollment of 70 students and a student–teacher ratio of 1:6. In 2020, the school's student body was 60.0% (24) White, 25.0% (10) Asian, 12.5% (5) Black and 2.5% (1) Hispanic.

Athletics
The school competes in interscholastic sports as part of the Penn-Jersey Athletic Association. Athletic programs offered to students include Volleyball, Cross-country, Basketball and Track for girls; and Cross-country, Basketball and Track for boys.

References

External links
New Jersey United Christian Academy website
Data for New Jersey United Christian Academy, National Center for Education Statistics

Christian schools in New Jersey
2003 establishments in New Jersey
Educational institutions established in 2003
Upper Freehold Township, New Jersey
Private high schools in Monmouth County, New Jersey
Private middle schools in New Jersey